Jischke's Meat Market is a historic building located at 414 Maple Dr. in Sister Bay, Wisconsin. Built in 1902, the building was originally a butcher shop run by Frank Jischke and his son M. J. The Jischkes were German immigrants who settled in Door County in 1892; they originally lived in Ephraim and later moved to Sister Bay. In addition to his work at the butcher shop, M. J. Jischke was a prominent citizen in Sister Bay who served as constable and postmaster.

The store is currently occupied by a bed and breakfast called Roots Inn and Kitchen. The inn uses the market as a gift shop and common area and has rooms in the Jischke's second floor living space.

The store was added to the National Register of Historic Places on September 11, 1986.

References

Commercial buildings on the National Register of Historic Places in Wisconsin
Commercial buildings completed in 1902
Buildings and structures in Door County, Wisconsin
National Register of Historic Places in Door County, Wisconsin
German-American culture in Wisconsin